Kabulistan (Pashto: کابلستان) is a historical regional name referring to the territory that is centered on present-day Kabul Province of Afghanistan. 

In many Greek and Latin sources, particularly editions of Ptolemy's Geography, the name of the region is given as Cabolitae. European writers in the 18th to the 20th centuries sometimes referred to Durrani Empire as the Kingdom of Caboul.

See also
Kabul Shahi

References

Historical regions of Afghanistan
History of Kabul